Guam Highway 16 (GH-16), also named Army Drive, is one of the primary automobile highways in the United States territory of Guam .

Route description
GH-16 serves as one of the chief routes of the island's central plateau, splitting off from GH-8 in Barrigada and turning northeast, skirting around the eastern reaches of Tiyan (formerly Naval Air Station Guam) and the neighboring Antonio B. Won Pat International Airport, eventually reaching an interchange. This single-point urban interchange is with two routes: GH-10A (which heads west back towards the airport's terminals) and GH-25, which heads east towards Dededo. From the interchange, GH-16 hugs the edge of the plateau, overlooking the Harmon Industrial Park, before turning north-northeast, descending, and forming the border between the communities of Tamuning (on the west) and Dededo (on the east). GH-16 intersects GH-27 and  GH-27A before reaching Micronesia Mall and ending at a T-intersection with GH-1, alongside the mall and still on the Tamuning/Dededo border.

Major intersections

References

16